VISA Steel Limited is a mineral and metals company situated in the Kalinganagar industrial complex of Jajpur Odisha, India with a 1.5 million ton integrated special and stainless steel manufacturing plant. VISA Steel has its registered office in Bhubaneswar, corporate office in Kolkata and branch offices across India. A listed company, VISA Steel’s shares are traded on the BSE and NSE.

The company has set up a 125,000 TPA Ferro Chrome Plant at Kalinganagar in Odisha. The facilities include 5 submerged Arc Furnaces with 3x25 MW Power Generating Units. The company is setting up an integrated 1 million TPA Special and Stainless Steel Plant at Kalinganagar Industrial Complex, Odisha. The first phase of 0.5 million TPA Special Steel Long Product Plant with 75 MW captive power plant is fully operational. The facilities include a 0.4 million TPA Coke Oven Plant, 0.225 million TPA Pig Iron Plant, 0.3 million TPA Sponge Iron Plant, 0.05 million TPA Ferro Chrome Plant, 75 MW captive power plant, 0.5 million TPA Steel Melt Shop (with EAF, LRF and VD) and 0.5 million TPA Rolling Mill (Bar & Wire Rod Mill). Capacity of this plant is planned to be doubled to 1 million TPA.
 
The company plans to integrate backwards to the mining of iron ore, chrome ore and coal. Captive iron ore mining leases in Odisha are under the process of allotment by the Government. A chrome ore deposit in Odisha is being developed through Ghotaringa Minerals Limited, a subsidiary of the company.
 
VISA Steel also plans to set up a fully integrated 2.5 million TPA Steel Plant with 500 MW captive power plant at Raigarh in Chhattisgarh.
 
The company also plans to set up a 1.25 million TPA Steel Plant, 100,000 TPA Manganese Alloy Plant and 300 MW captive power plant in Madhya Pradesh.

See also
 List of steel producers

References

External links
 Official website
 Vishambar Saran

Steel companies of India
Companies established in 2003
Companies based in Odisha
Companies based in Kolkata
Companies listed on the National Stock Exchange of India
Companies listed on the Bombay Stock Exchange